Nickelous Miller (born March 29, 1987) is a former American football wide receiver. He was signed by the  Oakland Raiders as an undrafted free agent in 2009. He played college football at Southern Utah.

Miller also played for the St. Louis Rams and Arizona Rattlers.

Early years
Miller played high school football at Red Mountain High School in Mesa, Arizona. He was a 1st Team All-Region wide receiver; and a 2nd Team All-State honoree and 1st Team All-Tribune selection at defensive back. Miller recorded up 656 receiving yards and eight touchdowns during his senior season. He also intercepted five passes and helped his team to an East Valley region championship.

Miller also lettered in baseball and track.

College career
After transferring from Scottsdale Community College, Miller became a starting wide receiver at Southern Utah University in 2007. He set an SUU record with 41 kickoff returns for 914 yards. He also finished second on the team in receptions and receiving yards, with 35 catches for 435 yards and a touchdown. In addition to the 19 carries he had for 50 yards, he also led the team with 19 punt returns for 175 yards.

As a senior in 2008, Miller was named Great West Conference Special Teams Players of the Year and caught 55 passes for 763 yards and three touchdowns.

Professional career

Oakland Raiders
Miller went undrafted in the 2009 NFL Draft, but was signed by the Oakland Raiders as an undrafted free agent. He survived final cuts on September 5 and made Oakland's 53-man roster. However, he never played during his rookie season because of a shin injury. On December 30, Miller was placed on injured reserve with the shin injury.

On October 10, 2010, Miller made his official NFL debut, returning a punt 46 yards in the third quarter of the Raiders' 35-27 win over the San Diego Chargers. On October 24, 2010 Nick Miller made a 32-yard catch along the sideline for his first career catch. On October 1, 2011, Miller was released by the Raiders.

St. Louis Rams
The St. Louis Rams signed Miller on October 6, 2011. He was waived on October 22, but re-signed on November 25, 2011. On Oct. 27, Miller returned a punt 88 yards against the Arizona Cardinals for his first career touchdown in the NFL. The punt return was the longest in Rams' history since 1994. He was released on March 12, 2012.

Philadelphia Eagles
On January 8, 2013, Miller was signed by the Philadelphia Eagles. On July 24, 2013, Miller was released by the Philadelphia Eagles. On July 30, 2013, Miller was re-signed by the Philadelphia Eagles to take the roster spot of Jeremy Maclin, who was placed on injured reserve after tearing his ACL. On August 25, 2013, Miller was released by the Eagles.

Arizona Rattlers
On November 15, 2013, Miller was assigned to the Arizona Rattlers of the Arena Football League. Miller was the Rattlers kick returner as well as working in at wide receiver. After 10 games, Miller was placed on injured reserve and ultimately reassigned by the Rattlers after an off the field health incident.

References

External links
Oakland Raiders bio
Twitter

1987 births
Living people
Sportspeople from Mesa, Arizona
Players of American football from Arizona
American football wide receivers
American football return specialists
Southern Utah Thunderbirds football players
Oakland Raiders players
St. Louis Rams players
Philadelphia Eagles players
Arizona Rattlers players